Mandrin is a 1962 French-Italian historical adventure film directed by Jean-Paul Le Chanois and starring Georges Rivière, Silvia Monfort, Jeanne Valérie and Dany Robin. It is based on the life of the celebrated smuggler and brigand Louis Mandrin who operated during the reign of Louis XV.

The film's sets were designed by the art director Anatol Radzinowicz. Location shooting took place around the town of Zakopane in southern Poland as well as the Château de Vigny outside Paris.

Cast
 Georges Rivière as Louis Mandrin
 Silvia Monfort as Myrtille
 Jeanne Valérie as Antoinette
 Georges Wilson as Bélissard
 Dany Robin as La baronne d'Escourt
 Maurice Baquet as Court-Toujours
 Jess Hahn as Bertrand le braco
 Armand Mestral as Sigismond de Moret
 Albert Rémy as Grain de sel
 André Versini as Le marquis d'Ulrich
 Gil Baladou as Le ménestrel
 Tadeusz Bartosik as Le gitan Marco	
 Leon Niemczyk as Le traître Grandville
 Claude Carliez as 	Un aristocrate
 Anatol Kobylinski as 	Un contrebandier
 Jean-Paul Le Chanois as Le confesseur de la baronne d'Escourt
 Krzysztof Litwin as Herold
 Artur Mlodnicki as Le sergent
 Leopold R. Nowak as 	Un contrebandier
 Wladyslaw Pawlowicz as 	Un soldat
 Georges Rouquier as Voltaire

See also
Mandrin (1924)
Mandrin (1947)

References

Bibliography 
 Oscherwitz, Dayna & Higgins, MaryEllen. The A to Z of French Cinema. Scarecrow Press, 2009.

External links 
 

1962 films
French historical adventure films
Italian historical adventure films
1960s historical adventure films
1960s French-language films
Films directed by Jean-Paul Le Chanois
Films set in the 18th century
Titanus films
Films set in Paris
Films shot in Paris
Films shot in Poland
1960s French films
1960s Italian films